George Alfred Magee ('Colonel') Kolkhorst (1897–1958) was an Oxford don, first a lecturer and then Reader in Spanish.

Life
Kolkhorst was the son of an engineer, and was brought up in Chile. His family then moved to Portugal. In the later part of World War I he was in Galicia, Spain on official work.

A member of Exeter College, Oxford, he was appointed University Lecturer in Spanish in 1921 and Reader in Spanish in 1931, holding office until his death in 1958. He used to wear a cube of sugar on a string around his neck "to sweeten my conversation", and was universally known among Oxford undergraduates as "Colonel" Kolkhorst — allegedly because he looked and behaved so utterly unlike a colonel. His home was at Yarnton Manor and he held salons in Beaumont Street.

His friendship with John Betjeman led to his inclusion in Summoned by Bells, Betjeman's verse autobiography. A poem about Kolkhorst's death is included in Betjeman's posthumous collection Harvest Bells (pp. 99–101).

References
 Noel Annan, The Dons: Mentors, Eccentrics and Geniuses (London: HarperCollins, 1999), p. 138.

Notes

External links
Kolkhorst and Arteaga Exhibitions in Spanish 2005–6, Oxford University Gazette (17 November 2005)
Judith Priestman, 'The dilettante and the dons', Oxford Today vol. 18, no. 3 (Trinity 2006)
Charles Saumarez Smith, 'Always from the heart', The Observer (Sunday August 6, 2006)
Tournai Tapestry, Maritime Museum, Portugal
'Yarnton: Manor and other estates', A History of the County of Oxford: Volume 12: Wootton Hundred (South) including Woodstock (1990), pp. 475–478
Brooke Allen, 'Betjeman: a "whim of iron"', The New Criterion, vol. 23, no. 7 (March 2005) 
R. M. Healey, 'Best Of British', Rare Book Review

1897 births
1958 deaths
Alumni of Exeter College, Oxford
Fellows of Exeter College, Oxford
Linguists from England
English art collectors
Literary critics of Spanish
Academics of the University of Oxford